Anaconda, county seat of Deer Lodge County, which has a consolidated city-county government, is located in southwestern Montana, United States. As of the 2020 census the population of the consolidated city-county was 9,421, and the US Census Bureaus's 2015-2019 American Community Survey showed a median household income of $41,820. Anaconda had earlier peaks of population in 1930 and 1980, based on the mining industry. As a consolidated city-county area, it ranks as the ninth most populous city in Montana, but as only a city is far smaller.

The county has common borders with Beaverhead, Butte-Silver Bow, Granite, Jefferson and Powell counties.

History

Anaconda was founded by Marcus Daly, one of the Copper Kings, who financed the construction of the Anaconda smelter on nearby Warm Springs Creek to process copper ore from the Butte mines. In June 1883, Daly filed for a town plat for "Copperopolis", but that name was already used by another mining town in Meagher County. Instead, Daly accepted the name "Anaconda", suggested by the United States postmaster of the time, Clinton Moore. Moore chose the name because of the important mining smelter already existing in the area. When Montana was admitted as a state in 1889, Daly lobbied to have the capital moved here, but it stayed in Helena, a location supported by rival William Andrews Clark, following a referendum.

In 1903, the Socialist Party of America won its first victory west of the Mississippi when Anaconda voters elected a socialist mayor, treasurer, police judge, and three councilmen. The Socialist Party had grown within the expanding Montana labor movement. Initially, the Anaconda Copper Mining Company tolerated socialist activities, but when the Socialists gained political power and threatened to implement reform, the company systematically undermined the party. City workers and councilmen refused to cooperate with the new mayor, and the company began to fire Socialists. In the long run labor lost ground in Anaconda and the company exerted ever greater political control.

The Anaconda Company expanded smelting capacity over time; by 1919 the Washoe Reduction Works could boast that its 585-foot (178 m) smokestack (Anaconda Smelter Stack) was the tallest masonry structure in the world and that the smelter-refining complex constituted the world's largest non-ferrous processing plant.

In 1980, Atlantic Richfield Company closed the smelter, bringing an end to almost a century of mineral processing.  While some aspects of the operation had been cleaned up under environmental laws, closing the smelter resulted in a large area contaminated with hazardous wastes. Since then, an operation for environmental cleanup was put into place by the federal Environmental Protection Agency and executed with the assistance of ARCO. The multimillion-dollar cleanup and redevelopment has resulted in the "Old Works" Golf Course, a championship 18-hole course designed by Jack Nicklaus.

Anaconda joined with Deer County to form a consolidated city-county government in 1977. Part of Anaconda is included in the Butte-Anaconda Historic District.

Geography
 Elevation: 
 Average annual rainfall: 
 Average length of growing season: 114 days
 Average annual snowfall: 
 Average annual temperature:

Climate

According to the Köppen climate classification, Anaconda has a humid continental climate

Demographics

Arts and culture

On main street is the Washoe Theater, which is listed on the National Register of Historic Places.  It was the last theater constructed in the United States in the Nuevo Deco style. The theater was designed in 1930 by B. Marcus Priteca, an architect from Seattle and opened in 1936.  It was listed by the NRHP for architectural significance in 1982.  It currently is used for showing films, plus periodically hosting plays and other types of entertainment.

Government and politics

Deer Lodge County voters have a record as the most consistently Democratic county in Montana for Presidential elections. These voters have not supported a Republican candidate since Calvin Coolidge in 1924. In the last five elections before 2016, the Democratic candidate has won by 21% to nearly 49% of Deer Lodge County's vote. In gubernatorial elections, the only Republican to carry the county in the last twenty years was Marc Racicot in the 1996 election. In that election the original Democratic nominee, Chet Blaylock, died and Marc Racicot carried every county.

The city is in the 39th district of the Montana Senate and is represented by Democrat Gene Vuckovich in the 2019 legislative session.

Elected in 2017, Bill Everett is the current CEO. The CEO is elected by a plurality vote on a non-partisan ballot for a four-year term.

Sports and recreation
Hunting –  There are hundreds of square miles of hunting available to the public in the area. With permit, hunting is permitted for fowl, bear, mountain lion, elk, deer and moose. Only deer and elk hunting is allowed without prior application to the state hunting license draw.
Fishing – Many nearby mountain lakes and streams offer such primary fishing spots as Silver Lake, Georgetown Lake, Echo Lake, Storm Lake, Racetrack Lake, Warm Springs Creek, Warm Springs Ponds, and the Big Hole River.
Golf – The Old Works Golf Course is a Jack Nicklaus-signature golf course, developed of brownfield land. A local country club and an 18-hole championship golf course are located at Fairmont Hot Springs.
Darts -The annual Winter Getaway dart tournament, held in several local establishments, is the largest regional dart tournament in Montana.
Museums – The Copper Village Museum and Arts Center provides visitors and residents with art and history of the local area.
 Hiking – Hiking opportunities in and around Anaconda include trails up to mountain lakes and a  mountain that can be climbed without technical equipment.  A walking trail is on the north side of Anaconda next to Warm Springs Creek.
Drag Racing  –  Lost Creek Raceway was founded in 1986 and hosts over 20 events a year bringing racers from Washington, Idaho and Montana.
Mountain Biking

Education

Four schools are part of Anaconda School District 10, including a Head Start program; Lincoln Elementary (grades k-3), Fred Moodry Intermediate School (grades 4–6), and Anaconda Junior-Senior High School (grades 7–12). Anaconda High School is known as the Copperheads.

The Hearst Free Library serves the area.

Infrastructure
Bowman Field is a public airport located three miles (5 km) northeast of Anaconda.

Media
The Anaconda Leader is the local newspaper. It is published twice weekly.

Film credits

Anaconda has been a filming location for a few movies, documentaries and a TV show, including:

 1960 - Perch of The Devil,  Harvey Richards Media Archive (Estuary Press)
 1974 - The Legendary Mountain.  Montana State University Film and T.V. Center
 1978 - The Other Side of Hell, Aubrey-Lyon Productions
 1981 - Today, NBC News Production 
 1985 - Runaway Train,  Golan-Globus Productions
 1986 - Better Pictures,  Left Handed Pictures
 1987 - Portrait Of America,  Turner Broadcasting System
 1992 - Return to Better Pictures,  Sloppy Films
 1993 - Return to Lonesome Dove, Artisan Home Entertainment 
 2005 - Backroads of Montana,  Montana PBS
 2008 - Prodigal Sons,  Big Sky Productions
 2012 - Diggers, Half Yard Productions
 2016 - Dead 7,  Syfy 
 2016 - Lester Leaps In,  Montana Mafia Productions
 2018 - Jeremy Bass: We Will Be You,  Annie McCain Casting
 2018 - Far Cry 5: Inside Eden's Gate,  Asylum Entertainment
 2019 - Worth The Wait,  Maney Telefilm Co.
 2019 - Mickey and the Bear,  Utopia
 2020 - Trail of Justice,  Eagle Ridge Studios
 2020 - Two Eyes, Two Eyes Productions
 2020 - Backroads of Montana,  Montana PBS
 2022 - The Ghost Town Terror,  Travel Channel
 2022 - Stu,   Sony Pictures Releasing
 2022 - 1923 (TV series),  101 Studios, Bosque Ranch Productions & MTV Entertainment Studios
 TBA - Brown,  Dark Frames
 TBA - Broke,  Broken Films

Notable people
Lucille Ball – actress; lived in Anaconda briefly as a child; she was born in Jamestown, New York.
John H. Collins – classical scholar
Frank Cope – New York Giants offensive lineman
Joseph Paul Cretzer - Bank Robber & Alcatraz Inmate
Marcus Daly – founder of Anaconda, and one of the "Copper Kings" of Butte
Lester Dragstedt – first surgeon to successfully separate conjoined twins
Wayne Estes – college basketball star
Bert Glennon – cinematographer and director
Raymond Hunthausen – Roman Catholic Archbishop of Seattle 
Rob Johnson – former Major League Baseball catcher
Ed Kalafat – NBA Minneapolis Lakers basketball player
Nancy Keenan – politician, NARAL president
Hal C. Kern – film editor
Angela McLean – Lieutenant Governor of Montana
Jesse Laslovich - Montana Attorney & US District Attorney for District of Montana
Milan Lazetich – football player for Los Angeles Rams
George A. Lingo – politician in the Alaska Territory
Jack Morris, S.J. – born in Anaconda, founded and named the Jesuit Volunteer Corps.
Casper Oimoen – Olympic ski jumper
Bill Ray – Alaska businessman, politician, writer
Roger Rouse - Professional Boxer
Michael Sells – Islamic studies expert
Bridget Sullivan - Lizzie Borden's maid. Lived in Anaconda for the rest of her life until her death.
George Leo Thomas – Roman Catholic Bishop of Helena
Ralph "Papa" Thorson – bounty hunter, subject of The Hunter starring Steve McQueen
Lester Thurow – economist
John H. Tolan – U.S. Congressman from California
Gene Vuckovich - Montana Senate of 39th District
Thomas J. Ward – Medal of Honor recipient in the Civil War

See also
Atlantic Cable Quartz Lode

References

Further reading
 Mercier, Laurie. Anaconda: Labor, Community, and Culture in Montana's Smelter City (University of Illinois Press, 2001) 300pp

External links

 Official website
 Chamber of Commerce
 Clark Fork Watershed Education Program
 Video portrait of Anaconda
 

 
Company towns in Montana
Cities in Deer Lodge County, Montana
County seats in Montana
Populated places established in 1883
1883 establishments in Montana Territory
Cities in Montana
Anaconda Copper